The 1908 Kentucky Derby was the 34th running of the Kentucky Derby. The race took place on May 5, 1908. Muddy track conditions made the winning time 2:15.20 the slowest Derby ever. The winner was 61-1 and marked the last (most recent) time that the winner lost his most recent race by 10 or more lengths.

Full results

Winning Breeder: James B. A. Haggin; (KY)

Payout

 The winner received a purse of $4,850.
 Second place received $700.
 Third place received $300.

References

1908
Kentucky Derby
Derby
1908 in American sports
May 1908 sports events